The Harvard Review of Psychiatry is a peer-reviewed medical journal covering all aspects of psychiatry. The editor-in-chief is Joshua L. Roffman.  According to the Journal Citation Reports, the journal has a 2017 impact factor of 3.264.

References

External links 
 

Publications established in 1993
Harvard University academic journals
Psychiatry journals
Bimonthly journals
Lippincott Williams & Wilkins academic journals
English-language journals